{{Infobox school
 | name                    = East Haven High School
 | motto                   = "Exploring, Empowering, Achieving"
 | established             = 
 | type                    = Public
 | grades                  = 9-12
 | enrollment              = 866 (2021-2022)<ref>
East Haven High School is a co-educational public school located in East Haven, Connecticut. It serves grades nine through twelve and its school colors are blue and gold, with the mascot being the yellow jacket. The school is a member of the Southern Connecticut Conference (SCC) for athletics.

Location 
The school is located at 35 Wheelbarrow Lane in East Haven, Connecticut. The current building opened in September 1997. The original high school building, located at 200 Tyler Street, was converted into apartments for adults 55 and over in 2020.

Accreditation 
East Haven High School is accredited by the New England Association of Schools and Colleges (NEASC).

Academics
The school's curriculum includes a diverse range of courses, including English language arts, mathematics, social studies, science, world language, fine arts, music, physical education/health, and career/technical education. The school also partners with the University of Connecticut and Gateway Community College to offer dual enrollment courses for college credit.

Athletics
East Haven High School provides a wide range of athletic opportunities for its students through its women's and men's sports programs. These programs span across three levels of competition - freshman, junior varsity, and varsity - and are available during the fall, winter, and spring seasons.

Fall sports include soccer, cheerleading, swimming, football, volleyball, and cross country. Winter sports include basketball, hockey, indoor track, wrestling, and pom poms. Spring sports include baseball, softball, outdoor track, tennis, and golf.

Extracurricular activities 

The East Haven co-op marching band includes students from East Haven High School and neighboring North Branford High School. This group earned national recognition by winning the Class 2A title in the 2019 USBands competition and the Class 1A title in 2022.

Notable alumni

Mike Lawlor '74 - State Representative
Ed Rapuano '75 - Major League Baseball (MLB) Umpire
Matt DelGuidice '86 - Former National Hockey League (NHL) Goalie

References

External links

 East Haven, Connecticut
 Schools in New Haven County, Connecticut
 Public high schools in Connecticut
 Educational institutions established in 1936
 1936 establishments in Connecticut